The Sormovsko-Meshcherskaya line is the second line of the Nizhny Novgorod Metro. The line opened in 1993 and crosses the city on a northwest–southeast axis and is generally coloured blue on Metro maps. The construction of the line continues. On June 12, 2018, the Strelka station was opened, in conjunction with the FIFA World Cup.

History 
The project of the second line began before the construction of the metro in the Soviet era. At that time, it carried the project name "Sormovsko-Nizhegorodskaya" and was supposed to connect the Lower City and the Upper City. This option planned the construction of 11 stations: Sormovskaya, Sportivnaya, Kalininskaya, Kuibyshevskaya, Kanavinskaya, Gorkovskaya, Sverdlovskaya, Ploshchad Svobody, Republikanskaya and Sovetskaya. In January 1981, the second line (Sormovsko-Nagornaya) was developed, but in March of the same year it was decided to extend the Avtozavodsko-Meshcherskaya line (project name of Line 1) to the Palace of Culture of the Avtozavodsky city district.

In December 1990, the development of the Sormovo-Meshcherskaya line to the stations Yarmarka, Strelka, Meshcherskoe ozero and Volga was approved. In January 1992, it was decided to rename the stations under construction: Kuibyshevskaya to Burnakovskaya, Kalininskaya to Burevestnik, Sportivnaya to Varya.

20 December 1993, the opening of two new stations of Nizhny Novgorod Metro - Kanavinskaya and Burnakovskaya which marked the beginning of the Sormovsko-Meshcherskaya line. 9 September 2002, the third station, Burevestnik, was opened on the line.

Driving directionality

Traffic in Russian metros move on the right, but Sormovsko-Meshcherskaya line is an exception. This line was a branch of the Avtozavodskaya line until May 2018, and at Moskovskaya station the part of trains from Avtozavodskaya line used to go at the side tracks (instead of central), then go to Sormovsko-Meshcherskaya line in the opposite direction without any crossing. Therefore, this line moves on the left-hand traffic. This rule remains even after those lines became independent, due to need to speed up passenger interchange during the morning commute.

Timeline

Stations and connections

References 

Nizhny Novgorod Metro lines
Railway lines opened in 1993